Edward F. Coppinger is an American politician who represents the 10th Suffolk District in the Massachusetts House of Representatives. Coppinger was sworn into office in January 2011. His district covers all of West Roxbury, South Brookline, and a portion of Roslindale. He lives in West Roxbury, Massachusetts with his wife and four daughters.

Personal life 
A lifetime resident of West Roxbury, Coppinger has long been active in the community, from coaching teams in local sports leagues to serving on the board of West Roxbury Main Streets. In March 2008, Coppinger partnered with his friend, John Fitzgerald, to build and publish the website, www.parkwayboston.com, a local news website where parents could find information about local sports leagues and events for their children. Coppinger stopped working on the site once he announced his plans to run for office in order to prevent any concerns over conflict of interest.

2010 Campaign 
He defeated five opponents in a Democratic primary on September 14, 2010, garnering nearly 2,600 votes with the runner-up finishing with over 1,500 votes. Coppinger's results were strongest in the Boston part of the 10th Suffolk District where 2,461 votes were cast in his favor. Kelly Tynan, the second place candidate in the Boston part of the district ended up with 1194 votes.

First Term in Office 
For his first term in the House of Representatives, Coppinger served on the Joint Committees on Housing, Elder Affairs and State Administration and Regulatory Oversight. After a year in office, he was moved to the Joint Committee on Financial Services.

In addition to actively working on legislation and the state budget at the State House, Coppinger stayed very active in local community matters. After the Irish Social Club in West Roxbury suddenly announced that it was going to close, Coppinger joined with many local residents and Club members to keep the club open. Coppinger chaired the Fundraising Committee charged with kickstarting the fundraising efforts necessary to keep the Club open on a permanent basis. The successful Save the Irish Social Club Fundraiser staved off closure and the Club continues to thrive. In December, 2011, Coppinger and his friend Keith Barry noticed that West Roxbury did not have any Christmas decorations, so they worked together to raise funds to purchase wreaths and bows and put them on street light fixtures along Centre Street in West Roxbury.

Coppinger is up for re-election in the Fall of 2012,  but is running unopposed in both the Democratic primary in September and the general election in November.

See also
 2019–2020 Massachusetts legislature
 2021–2022 Massachusetts legislature

References

External links 
 Personal website
 Member profile, Massachusetts legislature

Living people
Democratic Party members of the Massachusetts House of Representatives
Politicians from Boston
Bryant University alumni
Year of birth missing (living people)
21st-century American politicians
People from West Roxbury, Boston